The Six Days of Buenos Aires was a former six-day cycling event, held in Luna Park stadium, Buenos Aires, Argentina.

Winners

References
http://www.memoire-du-cyclisme.eu/piste_6jours/6j_buenos_aires.php

Cycle races in Argentina
Sports competitions in Buenos Aires
Six-day races
1956 in track cycling